The following highways are numbered 769:

United States